The Central Bank of Sri Lanka has issued commemorative coins since 1957.

On 15 December 2010, to mark the 60th Anniversary, the Central Bank of Sri Lanka issued a Frosted Proof crown size multi-colour silver commemorative coin in the denomination of Rupees 5000. It was the first multi-colour coin issued by the Central Bank.

Commemorative coins issued by the Central Bank of Sri Lanka:

See also
 Coins of the Sri Lankan rupee
 Sri Lankan commemorative notes

References

External links

Coins of Sri Lanka
Lists of commemorative coins